Pont-Lafrance was a settlement in New Brunswick.  It is now part of the Regional Municipality of Grand Tracadie–Sheila.

Pont-Lafrance  After the Rev. Francois Xavier Lafrance (1814-67), one of the founders of Collège Saint-Joseph, who served as parish priest at Tracadie.

History

Notable people

See also
List of communities in New Brunswick

References

Neighbourhoods in Grand Tracadie-Sheila
Former municipalities in New Brunswick